Léon Torfs (born 22 September 1909, date of death unknown) was a Belgian footballer. He played in three matches for the Belgium national football team from 1933 to 1937.

References

External links
 

1909 births
Year of death missing
Belgian footballers
Belgium international footballers
Place of birth missing
Association footballers not categorized by position